The Haouch Khemisti massacre took place before dawn on April 22, 1997 in the Algerian village of Haouch Mokhfi Khemisti, some 25 km south of Algiers near Bougara. An armed group killed 93 villagers in a 3 hour long attack because they refused to "collaborate", since armed groups depended on the aid of citizens who provide food, money and other necessities for their survival. The bodies were found decapitated.  A member of the family who arrived in Algiers said "We have no more to give. They've already taken everything." It was followed the next day by the Omaria massacre near Médéa.

See also
 List of massacres in Algeria
 List of Algerian massacres of the 1990s

External links
 CNN
 L'Express

References 

Algerian massacres of the 1990s
1997 in Algeria
Conflicts in 1997
Massacres in 1997
April 1997 events in Africa